Atitara is a genus of flowering plants in the family Arecaceae.

Species
Atitara aculeata
Atitara americana 
Atitara polyphylla

References

Arecaceae genera
Cocoseae